Jagraon Assembly constituency (Sl. No.: 70) is a Punjab Legislative Assembly constituency in Ludhiana district, Punjab state, India.
The incumbent MLA since 2017, is Saravjit Kaur Manuke of the Aam Aadmi Party after she was elected from the Jagraon consistency.

Members of the Legislative Assembly 

* = Bypoll

Election Results

2022
:

2017

Previous years

References

External links
  

Assembly constituencies of Punjab, India
Ludhiana district